Invasive hydatidiform mole is a type of neoplasia that grows into the muscular wall of the uterus. It is formed after conception (fertilization of an egg by a sperm). It may spread to other parts of the body, such as the vagina, vulva, and lung.

See also
Hydatidiform mole

References

External links
 Chorioadenoma destruens entry in the public domain NCI Dictionary of Cancer Terms

Gynaecological cancer